Keith Leonard Masefield (born 26 February 1957) is an English former professional footballer. He played for many teams, including Aston Villa, HFC Haarlem, Beerschot VAC, SC Telstar, and FC Lisse.

References

External links
Neil Brown

Living people
1957 births
Association football defenders
English footballers
Aston Villa F.C. players
English Football League players
English expatriate footballers
English expatriate sportspeople in Belgium
English expatriate sportspeople in the Netherlands
Eredivisie players
Eerste Divisie players
Belgian Pro League players
Expatriate footballers in Belgium
Expatriate footballers in the Netherlands
FC Lisse players
HFC Haarlem players
SC Telstar players
K. Beerschot V.A.C. players